The Planet Simulator (also known as a Planetary Simulator) is a machine designed to study the origin of life on planet Earth and beyond. The simulator machine was announced by researchers at McMaster University on behalf of the Origins Institute on 4 October 2018. The machine was developed  primarily to study a theory that suggests life on early Earth began in "warm little ponds", rather than in deep ocean vents, nearly four billion years ago. The simulator can recreate conditions of the primitive Earth to see whether cellular life can be created, and then later, evolve. According to physicist Maikel Rheinstadter, who is also the director of the simulator project, "We want to understand how the first living cell was formed - how the Earth moved from a chemical world to a biological world."

The one-of-a-kind planet simulator, manufactured by Angstrom Engineering Inc., can control temperature, humidity, pressure, atmosphere and radiation levels that may be consistent with conditions on the early Earth, or conditions on other astronomical bodies, including other planets, exoplanets and the like. The simulator project, begun in 2012, was funded with $1 million from the Canada Foundation for Innovation, the Ontario government and McMaster University, and was built by Angstrom Engineering Inc of Kitchener, Ontario.

Observations
According to researchers, preliminary tests with the simulator, under possible conditions of the early Earth, created protocells: cells which are not living but very important nonetheless. According to biologist David Deamer, the machine is a game changer, and the cells produced so far are "significant". The "cells are not alive, but are evolutionary steps toward a living system of molecules ... [the simulator] opens up a lot of experimental activities that were literally impossible before.” Based on initial tests with the new simulator technology, project director Rheinstadter stated that it "seems that the formation of life is probably a relatively frequent process in the universe".

References

External links
  at the Origins Institute of McMaster University
  – Angstrom Engineering Inc
  – McMaster University 

Astrobiology
Evolutionary biology
Origin of life
Prebiotic chemistry